Convoy RS 3 was a South Atlantic convoy which ran during the height of the Battle of the Atlantic in World War II. It was a small coastal convoy going from Rabat to Sierra Leone. The convoy lost its three biggest ships to U-boat attacks in March 1943, which contributed to the fact that in March 1943 most of the ships sunk by U-boats were lost in convoys. As convoying was the key answer to the U-boat threat, this led to a temporary crisis in Allied shipping.

Departure and detection 
When the convoy left Gibraltar, it consisted of three freighters, the cable layer Lady Denison-Pender and five tugboats. The cable layer was a particularly valuable ship. This ship was returning south after laying a cable connection between Gibraltar and Casablanca, in order to provide secure communications for the Casablanca Conference. The convoy was escorted by two corvettes and two armed naval trawlers.

The German B-Dienst signals intelligence group was able to decipher some signals which gave away the position of the convoy. The Germans were able to direct the "gruppe Seerauber" comprising eight U-boats to the convoy.  made contact with the convoy on 28 March between the Canary Islands and Dakar. Allied command did not realize the convoy was threatened and in the morning of 28 March, the two corvettes were sent away to reinforce the escort of a northbound convoy.

Attacks on 28 March 
Shortly after the corvettes left,  attacked and torpedoed SS Lagosian. The ship broke amidships and sank within seven minutes. Eleven survivors were rescued by the tugboat Empire Denis.

At 15:00  torpedoed MV Silverbeech which blew up and sank without survivors. As the ships were at that moment in shallow waters, the convoy commodore was not sure whether they should run into a protective coastal minefield or be attacked by the U-boats. A few minutes later  launched a spread of four torpedoes but all missed. At nightfall at 20:00 the zigzagging was stopped. U-172 caught up with the convoy and its first attack with one torpedo missed but then U-172 scored a hit on MV Moanda with a subsequent attack of two torpedoes. The ship sank the next morning at 02:00.

Aftermath 
The convoy was well protected by air patrols and on 29 March all U-boats lost contact. On 30 March the chase was abandoned. Two U-boats were damaged by the escorting aircraft; 
  was hit by depth charges and had to abandon patrol.
  was damaged but continued her patrol towards Dakar. The U-boat was relocated to a more quiet area.

Controversies

Sinkings 
The three sinkings by three different U-boats have been commented on in multiple sources, in older reference books these are the data:

 Blair mentions all three freighters as British, whilst the Moanda was Belgian. Blair has a standard practise of rounding the tonnage of the ships to two significant digits and mentions a 5,500-ton (U-159), a 4,600-ton (U-167) and a 5,300-ton (U-172) ship.
 Rohwer mentions a 4,621-ton (U-167), a 5,449-ton (U-159) and a 5,319-ton (U-172) ship.

But other website sources, mix up these data: for example

 uboat.net mentions Moanda sunk by U-172, the SilverBeech by U-159, and Lagosian by U-167.
 Most conclusive, Rohwer uses this data in the latest edition of his book, published on web.

These websites take into account the KriegsTageBuch of the U-172, as mentioned on the warsailors blog which clearly shows U-172 is the last U-boat to attack and sink a ship.

Escort 
Rohwer mentions that the corvettes left the convoy before the attack, but the situation report shows that the sloop  and the  HMS Burdock was with the convoy during the attacks on 28 March. Probably these ships returned when the attacks started.

The two armed trawlers do not appear nowhere in accounts of the battle, but two tugboats are mentioned to have stayed all time with the convoy, and to have picked up survivors.

References

Bibliography 
 
 
 Blair, Clay (1998) Hitler's U-Boat War [Volume 2]: The Hunted 1942–1945 Cassell  (2000 UK paperback ed.)

External links 
 

Convoys of World War II
Battle of the Atlantic
BN 7
Naval battles of World War II involving Germany